Henry V the Blondell (1216 – 24 December 1281), called the Great, was the Count of Arlon from 1226 to his death, lord of Ligny from 1240 to his death, Count of Luxembourg and Laroche from 1247 to his death, and the Marquis of Namur between 1256 and 1264 as Henry III. He was the son and successor of Waleran III, Duke of Limburg and Ermesinde, Countess of Luxembourg.

In 1226, following the death of his father Waleran III, Henry inherited the county of Arlon.

In 1240 Henry married Margaret, daughter of Henry II of Bar and Philippa of Dreux. Henry's marriage to Margaret brought him Ligny-en-Barrois as her dowry, though, by a clause in the marriage contract, it remained under the feudal suzerainty of the County of Bar. In contempt of this, Henry paid homage in 1256 to King Theobald II of Navarre in the latter's capacity as Count of Champagne. Henry's brother-in-law Count Theobald II of Bar took advantage of the conflict then raging between Duke Frederick III of Lorraine and the bishops of Metz. Henry V was a partisan of the duke and so Theobald took the side of the bishop. Henry was captured in battle at Prény on 14 September 1266. On 8 September 1268, King Louis IX of France arbitrated between the two counts and Henry was freed and repossessed of Ligny, but under the suzerainty of the Barrois.

Henry inherited Luxembourg and Laroche following the death of his mother, Ermesinde, in 1247. In 1256, Henry seized Namur while the reigning margrave, Baldwin II, was also reigning emperor in Constantinople. Baldwin sold his rights to Namur to Guy, Count of Flanders, who retook the margraviate from Henry. The two parties made peace and Guy married Henry's daughter, Isabelle.

Upon receiving 15,000 tournois from the Pope, Henry joined Edward of England on the Ninth Crusade. He returned with his remaining retainers after the crusaders achieved a truce with the Mamluk Sultanate.

Issue 

From Margaret he had the following issue:

Henry VI (died 1288), Count of Luxembourg
Waleran I (died 1288), Count of Ligny & Roussy. He is the forefather and founder of what became the french branch of the House of Luxembourg, the so-called house of Luxembourg-Ligny.
Isabelle (1247–1298), married Guy of Dampierre
Philippa (1252–1311), married John II, Count of Holland
Marguerite (lady of Macheren), living 1302
Felicitas
Jeanne (died 1310), Abbess at the Abbey of Clairefontaine

He also had at least two illegitimate sons, including:

Henry, bastard of Luxembourg (died 1288), married Isabelle of Houffalize, heiress of Houffalize
Baldwin

All of his sons perished in the Battle of Worringen in 1288.

Notes

References

1216 births
1281 deaths
13th-century Luxembourgian people
House of Luxembourg
Counts of Luxembourg
Margraves of Namur
House of Limburg
Counts of Namur
Counts of Arlon
Christians of Lord Edward's crusade